Sibley Lake is a body of water located six miles north of Dawson in Kidder County, North Dakota. It is fished for walleye and perch. In 1975, Sibley Lake was designated as a National Natural Landmark by the National Park Service.

References

Lakes of North Dakota
Bodies of water of Kidder County, North Dakota
National Natural Landmarks in North Dakota